John Anthony Parry (born 17 November 1986) is an English professional golfer.

Parry was born in Harrogate. He won several high-profile amateur tournaments including the Danish and Spanish Amateur Championships, and represented Great Britain and Ireland in the Walker Cup before turning professional at the end of 2007.

Parry won the 2009 Allianz Golf Open Grand Toulouse on the Challenge Tour. He ended that season in 14th place on the Challenge Tour Rankings to earn his card on the top level European Tour for 2010. During his rookie season he won the inaugural Vivendi Cup to secure a one-year exemption on the tour. Parry was unable to follow up his win and in 2021, he was playing on the third-tier PGA EuroPro Tour.

Amateur wins
2004 Peter McEvoy Trophy
2005 Danish Amateur Championship
2007 Spanish International Amateur Championship, Welsh Amateur Open Stroke Play Championship

Professional wins (4)

European Tour wins (1)

Challenge Tour wins (1)

PGA EuroPro Tour wins (2)

*Note: The 2008 Ladbrokescasino.com Masters was shortened to 36 holes due to rain.

Results in major championships

"T" indicates a tie for a place
NT = No tournament due to the COVID-19 pandemic
Note: Parry only played in the U.S. Open and The Open Championship.

Team appearances
Amateur
 European Boys' Team Championship (representing England): 2004 (winners)
Jacques Léglise Trophy (representing Great Britain and Ireland): 2004 (winners)
European Amateur Team Championship (representing England): 2007
Walker Cup (representing Great Britain and Ireland): 2007

See also
2009 Challenge Tour graduates
2012 European Tour Qualifying School graduates
2014 European Tour Qualifying School graduates
2016 European Tour Qualifying School graduates
2022 Challenge Tour graduates

References

External links

English male golfers
European Tour golfers
Sportspeople from Harrogate
People from Knaresborough
1986 births
Living people